During the First World War, the Canadian government authorized the formation of several mounted regiments, including cavalry and mounted infantry, to serve in the Canadian Expeditionary Force on the Western Front .

Three regiments, the Royal Canadian Dragoons, Lord Strathcona's Horse, and the Fort Garry Horse, served as throughout the war as part of the Canadian Cavalry Brigade, attached to British Army cavalry formations.

One regiment, the Canadian Light Horse, served as the Canadian Corps cavalry regiment.

Six regiments of mounted rifles served initially at the front as mounted infantry before being converted to infantry battalions. The remaining mounted rifle regiments were raised in Canada but broken up in England to provide reinforcements for other cavalry, mounted infantry and infantry units.

The regiments in bold type served in the field.

References 

Mounted Regiments of the Canadian Expeditionary Force